The Union of Arms (in Spanish Unión de Armas) was a political proposal, put forward by Gaspar de Guzmán, Count-Duke of Olivares for greater military co-operation between the constituent parts of the composite monarchy ruled by Philip IV of Spain. 

The plan was for each of the kingdoms ruled by Philip to contribute equitably to a fund from which 140,000 troops would be maintained for the defense of the monarchy. The plan was "a thinly disguised attempt to integrate the fiscal institutions of the empire [that] prompted much opposition in the Indies."

The division of contributions envisaged was:
Crown of Castile, 44,000 troops
Spanish Netherlands, 12,000 troops
Kingdom of Aragon, 10,000 troops
Kingdom of Valencia, 6,000 troops
Principality of Catalonia, 16,000 troops
Kingdom of Portugal, 16,000 troops
Kingdom of Naples, 16,000 troops
Kingdom of Sicily, 6,000 troops
Duchy of Milan, 8,000 troops
Mediterranean and Atlantic islands, 6,000 troops

Although the proposal ultimately failed, it was an important factor in the growing mistrust of Castilian hegemony that led to the Reapers' War in Catalonia and the Portuguese Restoration War.

See also
Spanish empire

Further reading
Andrien, Kenneth J. Crisis and Decline: The Viceroyalty of Peru in the Seventeenth Century. Albuquerque: University of New Mexico Press 1985.
Elliott, J.H., The Count-Duke Olivares: The Statesman in an Age of Decline. New Haven: Yale University Press 1966.
Israel, Jonathan I. Race, Class, and Politics in Colonial Mexico, 1610-1670. Oxford: Oxford University Press 1975.

References

Political history of Spain
Duchy of Milan
17th century in the Kingdom of Sicily
17th century in the Kingdom of Naples
1626 in the Habsburg Netherlands
1626 in Spain